Macaw is a colorful New World parrot. Macaw may also refer to:

 Macaw (web editor)
 Macaw palm, Acrocomia aculeata, a palm tree
 Multiple Access with Collision Avoidance for Wireless (MACAW)

See also
 Macau (disambiguation)
 McCaw (surname)